The United States 'Revenue and Expenditure Control Act of 1968 created a temporary 10 percent income tax surcharge on both individuals and corporations through June 30, 1969 to help pay for the Vietnam War. It also delayed the scheduled reduction in the telephone and automobile excise tax, causing them to end in 1973 instead of 1969. It was signed into law by President Lyndon Johnson on June 28, 1968.

Though overall creating a 10 percent surcharge, as Johnson stated just before signing the bill, "A family of four earning less than $5,000 ($ in  dollars) would pay nothing additional. A family making $10,000 ($ in  dollars) would pay just $2 ($ in  dollars) extra per week". It took into effect for corporations on January 1, 1968, and for individuals on April 1, 1968, being effective until July 1, 1969.

As a result of the tax, the Federal Government had a budget surplus in 1969 which would be the last until 1998. The tax has been the third largest 1-year revenue increase adjusted for inflation and the largest as a percent of the GDP since 1968, which is quite impressive for a surcharge that people don't often even know about.  The US economy showed slowdown starting in 1968. Quarterly, the GDP Growth gradually slowed from 8.4% in Q1 of 1968 to -1.9% in Q4 1969. Annually, the GDP Growth slowed from 4.8%  in 1968 to 0.2% in 1970. The tax, however, visibly did nearly nothing to help in the Vietnam War as the US pulled out of the war in 1973 and South Vietnam officially lost in 1975.

The automobile excise tax was repealed in 1971 in the Revenue Act of 1971 and the Federal telephone excise tax was continued until 2006. The act no longer has any legacy or stigma on the United States as everything contained in the bill has no effect on the current US Tax Law.

Legislative history

Final House of Representatives vote, June 20, 1968

Final Senate vote, June 21, 1968

References

United States federal taxation legislation
1968 in law